The Acropole is the oldest existing hotel in Khartoum that has been in service without interruption since it was established still during the Anglo-Egyptian Condominium rule over Sudan. After Sudanese independence in 1956 it has weathered several regime changes and developed into a popular entry point for visiting journalists, humanitarians, diplomats, archaeologists and other researchers.

History

During the Anglo-Egyptian Condominium 
The Acropole was founded in 1952 by Panagiotis Pagoulatos from Cephalonia, who had left Greece during WWII, and his wife Flora, who was from the community of the Greeks in Egypt, specifically from Alexandria. Since there was a sizeable community of Greeks in Sudan at the time as well, the couple settled in the Anglo-Egyptian colony. The Washington Post writes: "During the day, he was employed by the British government. After hours, he worked as a private accountant, soon amassing enough capital to open a night club just opposite the governor's palace". 

When the British Governor-General Sir Alexander Knox Helm had the "Great Britain Bar" closed because of the noise, the couple took over a liquor dealership, opened a wine store, a confectionery shop, and then the Acropole, which soon expanded.

Since Sudanese Independence 
When Sudan obtained sovereignty from its colonial masters on 1 January 1956, the Greek settlers in the country were issued Sudanese nationality certificates and generally continued to thrive in the first few years of independence. Their numbers had increased by then to around 6,000 or even 7,000. However, as political and economic turmoils grew,  the number of Greeks in Sudan diminished by 1965 to 4,000. This trend also affected the business of the Pagoulatos family. In 1967, the closed their confectionery shop, when it was damaged in an anti-government protest. In the same year, Panagiotis Pagoulatos died and his three sons Thanasis, George, and Gerasimos ("Mike")  took over the business: 
“With their mother’s guidance and their hard work, they managed to turn the hotel into an actual treasure of the city’s cultural and touristic life.”
Unlike many other Greek-Sudanese enterprises, the Acropole was spared from the policies of nationalisation following the 1969 coup d'état, since it was housed in a rented building. It suffered from the worsening economic crisis, but profited from the pro-Western swing after the failed 1971 coup d'état by parts of the Sudanese Communist Party.

In 1983 again, the Acropole lost part of its business, when dictator Gaafar Nimeiry introduced the draconic "September Laws" under the label of Sharia and had all beverages dumped into the Blue Nile. Until then, the Acropole had been the distributor of Amstel beer in the country.

Following the devastating 1984/85 famines in Darfur and Ethiopia, the Acropole became the base for many international non-governmental organisations, since it was the only hotel with reliable telephone, telex and fax lines. A framed letter from the Band Aid founder Bob Geldof on the wall of the hotel office gives evidence of his appreciation for the support by the Pagoulatos family and their staff, and Sudanese network. They also scrounged up goods for Oxfam and Save the Children to get to the camps. The author Edward Girardet described the hotel in 1985 as follows:

"From the outside the Acropole is totally unassuming: just another one of the drab, mustard-colored buildings that line the dusty, potholed streets in the heart of the Sudanese capital. Yet the Acropole's halls, rooms, and streetside balconies are spotlessly clean, simply but tastefully decorated in an airy, almost graceful 1930s Art Deco style."On 15 May 1988, the Acropole was shocked by tragedy, when a terrorist commando of the Abu Nidal group bombed the restaurant, killing a British couple with their two children, another Briton, and two Sudanese workers, leaving 21 people injured. According to The Economist, the attack on the soft target, which was well known for hosting many Westerners, was "in apparent revenge for the Israeli assassination in Tunisia of the PLO military leader Khalil al-Wazir." Five members of the group were arrested and convicted. Their death-sentences were turned into prison-time, when the relatives of the Sudanese victims agreed to the payment of "blood money". In January 1991, shortly before the Gulf War started, the new regime of the Islamist leader Hassan Al Turabi released the five.

Nevertheless, the Pagoulatos brothers managed to restore the hotel in a building just opposite the ruins of the old one. It has remained since then one of the most popular places for Western visitors, particularly journalists, archaeologists, and NGO workers. For this reason, the Acropole appears frequently in travel books.

When notorious filmmaker Leni Riefenstahl's helicopter crashed in the Nuba mountains in early 2000 at the age of 97, the Pagoulatos brothers found her a Sudan Airways captain and plane to rescue her and the crew, and had an ambulance waiting at the airport.An added attraction is the OHM electronics shop next door, which is owned by the brother of Sheikh Musa Hilal, previously the leader of Darfur's notorious Janjaweed militia. Several journalists and members of human rights organizations have managed to interview Hilal in that shop.
After the embassy of the Hellenic Republic was closed in September 2015, Greece's new diplomatic representative as Honorary Consul became Gerasimos Pagoulatos, with the Honorary Consulate based at the Acropole Hotel.

At the 2016 Venice Biennale of Architecture, George Pagoulatos was featured in the presentation of Sir David Chipperfield's design for a museum at the UNESCO World Heritage Site of Naga along with portrays of other people who are related to the archeological project, photographed by German photographer Heinrich Voelkel of the Berlin-based Ostkreuz photo agency. The caption of the image read: “I have been getting up at 5:30 a.m. for the last 50 years. My wife looks after me very well, she is my right hand, my left hand – an inspiration to me. We both grew up in Sudan. She is of Italian origin and I belong to the Greek minority. We have been happily married for 43 years.Some of the archeologists have come to our hotel for over 20 years. Having solved various problems together, we have developed strong bonds that go well beyond business relationships. We are like a family."In June 2022, George Pagoulatos died at the age of 76 years. The Süddeutsche Zeitung, one of the largest daily newspapers in Germany, hailed him in an obituary as "the best ambassador of Sudan"

Gallery

References

External links
Official site

Hotels in Sudan
Buildings and structures in Khartoum
Hotels established in 1955
Greek diaspora in Africa
1955 establishments in Sudan